Hennadiy Temnyk is a Ukrainian politician, former Minister of Regional Development, Construction and Communal Living.

Temnyk was born on June 9, 1970, in a village of Hurivka, Dolynska Raion, Kirovohrad Oblast. In 1992 he graduated from the Voronezh Higher Military Aviation Engineering College as a meteorologist.

In 1993-94 Temnyk work in militsiya of Kryvyi Rih fighting organized crime. After that and until 2006 he worked for number of private and community companies in the region.

In 2006-2012 Temnyk became a politician for the Dnipropetrovsk regional government working as a mayor deputy of Kryvyi Rih and governor deputy of Dnipropetrovsk Oblast.

On December 24, 2012, he was appointed the minister of Regional Development, Construction and Communal Living.

External links
 Profile at the Dnipropetrovsk Regional Administration website

1970 births
Living people
People from Kirovohrad Oblast
Ministers of Regional Development, Construction and Communal Living of Ukraine